San Benedetto del Tronto Lighthouse is an active lighthouse located on the waterfront of San Benedetto del Tronto, Marche on the Adriatic Sea.

Description
The lighthouse is completely automated and operated by the Marina Militare with the identification code number 3898 E.F.

See also
 List of lighthouses in Italy
 San Benedetto del Tronto

References

External links

 Servizio Fari Marina Militare

Lighthouses in Italy